ADN was a Spanish free daily newspaper from 2006 to 2011, published by Editorial Página Cero, a company owned by Grupo Planeta and groups in regional press, part of Grupo Antena 3. The paper was distributed to 16 provinces with local editions in Spain.

History
ADN was first published in March 2006 as a new daily newspaper model designed for a young, urban population. ADN covered the main cities and metropolitan areas in Spain, reaching a market share of 25%, with distribution exceeding 900,000 copies and an average of 1,268,000 daily readers. Due to the effects of the crisis in Spain in 2011, ADN closed. The last number was published on December 23, 2011.

Editions
The paper distributed localised editions to:
 A Coruña
 Barcelona
 Bilbao
 Cádiz
 Castellón
 Huesca
 Jerez
 Lleida
 La Rioja
 Málaga
 Madrid
 Mallorca
 Navarra
 Sevilla
 Teruel
 Valencia
 Vigo
 Zaragoza

References

External links
 adn.es

2006 establishments in Spain
2011 disestablishments in Spain
Defunct newspapers published in Spain
Defunct free daily newspapers
Daily newspapers published in Spain
Publications established in 2006
Publications disestablished in 2011
Spanish-language newspapers
Newspapers published in Barcelona
Planeta Group